Horsley is a small village roughly 5 miles north of the City of Derby, England, with a population of 973 at the 2011 Census.

The parish church of St Clement and St John, which dates from the 13th century, was rededicated in 1450. It is noted for its fine peal of bells.  The main street is Church Street which runs from east to west through the village.

Horsley has three main focal points: the village green at the West side of the village, the crossroads of The Dovecote, French Lane and Church Street, and the junction of Church Street, Lady Lea Road and Smalley Mill Road (known locally as "the triangle").

Each of these points boasts a fountain, donated to the village in 1864 by Reverend Sitwell.  The fountains were named Sophia, Rosamund and Blanche after the Sitwell family's daughters. The Sitwells of Horlsey, Derbyshire, were related to the Sitwell family of Leamington Hastings, Warwickshire, where they had inherited the lordship of the manor on marrying a Wheler family heiress.

The village pub is called the Coach and Horses. Horsley also used to have a second pub called the Ship Inn, but this has been a private house for many years. A recreation ground is situated off French Lane.  The rec has a small football pitch and contains the local crown green bowling club. The remains of 12th-century Horsley (Horeston) castle are about a mile away from the village itself.

Driving south from the village on Smalley Mill Road you will see Horsley Lodge and Horsley Lodge Golf Club. Opposite the golf club, Springwood Riding Club holds horse shows, on Sundays in the summer.

See also
Listed buildings in Horsley, Derbyshire, and Horsley Woodhouse

References

External links
 Horsley Parish Council
  Horsley Lodge
  Springwood Riding Club

Villages in Derbyshire
Civil parishes in Derbyshire
Geography of Amber Valley